The Romulus class was a class of two destroyers operated by the Royal Swedish Navy during the Second World War.
They were built in Italy as the Spica-class torpedo boats Spica and Astore in the mid-1930s and sold to Sweden in 1940.
The two ships were adapted for northern conditions and remained in service during  World War II and into the first decades of the Cold War. They were modernized and re-designated as anti-submarine frigates in 1953. Both ships were discarded in 1958.

Ships

Notes

References
 Robert Gardner, Conway's All the World's Fighting Ships 1922–1946 (1980) Conway Publishing : 

Destroyer classes
Destroyers of the Swedish Navy
 
World War II destroyers
Italy–Sweden relations